HID may refer to:

Science and technology
 Hardware interface design, a cross-disciplinary design field that shapes the physical connection between people and technology
 Helium ionization detector
 High-intensity discharge, a type of lamp
 Human-implantable device, a device that can be installed in the human body
 Human interface device, a computer device that interacts with humans
 USB human interface device class
 Hystrix-like ichthyosis–deafness syndrome

Organizations
 HID Global, an American manufacturing company
 Croatian Interdisciplinary Society, a non-governmental organization
 Most–Híd, a political party in Slovakia

Places
 Hall i' th' Wood railway station (Station code), in England
 Horn Island Airport, in Queensland, Australia
 Hidalgo (state), Mexico (abbreviated: HID or MX-HID)

Other uses
 Hidatsa language, spoken in the United States
 Stefani Hid (born 1985), Indonesian writer

See also

 HIDS (disambiguation)